Aceglutamide (brand name Neuramina), or aceglutamide aluminum (brand name Glumal), also known as acetylglutamine, is a psychostimulant, nootropic, and antiulcer agent that is marketed in Spain and Japan. It is an acetylated form of the amino acid L-glutamine, the precursor of glutamate in the body and brain. Aceglutamide functions as a prodrug to glutamine with improved potency and stability.

Aceglutamide is used as a psychostimulant and nootropic, while aceglutamide aluminum is used in the treatment of ulcers. Aceglutamide can also be used as a liquid-stable source of glutamine to prevent damage from protein energy malnutrition. The drug has shown neuroprotective effects in an animal model of cerebral ischemia.

See also 
 Aceburic acid
 Aceturic acid
 N-Acetylglutamic acid

References 

Acetamides
Amino acid derivatives
Drugs acting on the gastrointestinal system and metabolism
Nootropics
Prodrugs
Stimulants